Hoshangabad Assembly constituency is one of the constituencies of Madhya Pradesh Legislative Assembly in central India. In 2018 Vidhansabha Election, Dr. Sitasharan Sharma was elected as MLA from this constituency, this is the fifth term of Dr. Sitasharan Sharma as MLA from the same constituency. Dr. Sharma also served as the Speaker of the Madhya Pradesh Legislative Assembly, (2014-2019).  Narmada River is the life line of this constituency,  Security Paper Mill and Ordinance Factory are situated in this constituency,

It is part of Hoshangabad District.

Member of the Legislative Assembly

Election results

2018

See also
 Hoshangabad

References

Assembly constituencies of Madhya Pradesh